John Kass (born June 25, 1956) is an American columnist and former editorial board member for the Chicago Tribune and radio broadcaster. Until summer 2020, his opinion pieces regularly appeared on page 2 of the main news section of the Tribune, instead of on the opinion/editorial pages; this is the spot formerly occupied by Mike Royko.

Early life and education
His Tribune biography reports Kass as the son of a Greek immigrant grocer. Kass was born on the South Side of Chicago, and grew up there and in the Chicago suburb of Oak Lawn. He graduated from Harold L. Richards High School in the class of 1974, and was a member of the varsity football team and the yearbook staff. He studied film at Columbia College in Chicago and worked on the student newspaper, though he never graduated.

Career
Kass worked as an intern and later a reporter at the Daily Calumet, and worked from 1980 to June 2021 for the Tribune. He regularly covered political topics for the newspaper. His columns are syndicated by Tribune Content Agency. Kass also writes about lighter topics, particularly beer can chicken.

Kass hosted, first with Jake Hartford and later Lauren Cohn, a weekday morning talk-radio program on Cumulus Media-owned WLS-AM. His last show was February 26, 2015.

In June 2021, Kass took the buyout offer at the Chicago Tribune, after 38 years at the paper. In his final column, he announced his writing could continue to be found at johnkassnews.com.

Family
Kass married Betty Castela in Oak Lawn's St. Nicholas Greek Orthodox Church in 1986. They have twin sons and currently live in Saint John, Indiana.

References

External links

 Chicago Tribune, John Kass columns

1956 births
American male journalists
Radio personalities from Chicago
American people of Greek descent
Chicago Tribune people
Living people
Writers from Chicago